Sickles may refer to:

People
Carlton R. Sickles (1921–2004), American lawyer and congressman from Maryland
Daniel Sickles (1819–1914), American politician and Civil War general
Mark D. Sickles (born 1957), American politician
Nicholas Sickles (1801–1845), U.S. Representative from New York
Noel Sickles (1910–1982), American commercial illustrator and cartoonist
Robin Sickles, American economist
Teresa Bagioli Sickles (1836–1867), wife of Daniel Sickles
William Sickles (1844–1938), American Civil War soldier and Medal of Honor recipient

Places in the United States
Sickles, Oklahoma, an unincorporated community
Sickles, an unincorporated community in Hamilton Township, Gratiot County, Michigan

See also
Sickels, another surname
Sickle (disambiguation)